The Very Thought of You is a 1958 album by Nat King Cole, arranged by Gordon Jenkins. The album peaked at #17 on Billboard Magazine's Top LP chart.

Track listing
LP side A:

LP side B:

Bonus tracks added to Capitol Record's CD re-issue:

Bonus tracks added to the Collectors' Choice Music CD re-issue, recorded in 1962:

The "bonus" tracks "Don't Blame Me" and "There Is No Greater Love" were part of the original recording session, and were added to Capitol Record's 1987 and 1997 CD re-issues. In 2007 Collectors' Choice Music also re-issued "The Very Thought of You" on CD and included the tracks "Happy New Year" and "Farewell To Arms" from a 1962 recording session.

Personnel

Performance
 Nat King Cole – vocal
 Gordon Jenkins – arranger, conductor

References

External links
Capitol Records SW 1084 (The Very Thought of You) at discogs.org

1958 albums
Nat King Cole albums
Albums arranged by Gordon Jenkins
Capitol Records albums
Albums conducted by Gordon Jenkins